Creed is an Anglo-French multi-national niche perfume house, based in Paris.

The company was originally founded as a tailoring house in London, England in 1760 by James Henry Creed. It has boutiques in Paris, London, New York City, Beverly Hills, Sydney, Dubai, Kuwait City, Vienna, Mexico City, Milan, and Miami in addition to stands in high end retailers across the world. The current generation of creative directors consists of Olivier Creed and his son Erwin Creed.

Early history 

James Henry Creed supposedly founded the House of Creed in London in 1760 as a tailoring establishment, however, the earliest evidence of Creed's existence hark from the late 1960s or early 1970s. It claims to have risen to fame in the mid 19th century under Henry Creed as tailors and habit makers for the fashionable dandy Count d'Orsay, Queen Victoria, and Empress Eugénie, who issued the firm of Creed & Cumberland a Royal Warrant for tailoring articles. Olivier Creed's first eponymously named fragrance was a traditional eau de cologne with matching aftershave. Its release date is unknown, although bottles are still in circulation. Creed also has other high-profile creations in its catalog such as Angelique Encens, which was said to have been originally created in 1933 for the Bishop of Paris.

In February 2020, the private equity group BlackRock announced that it would become the majority shareholder of Creed.

Popular culture 
Creed has stated that it has created perfumes exclusively for celebrities and well-known political figures. Creed claims that Tabarome "was commissioned by a legendary British statesman who loved fine brandy and highest quality cigars" but this is without historical confirmation. Also, Creed's Vetiver is marketed to have been created for "one of America's leading families, a political dynasty now known worldwide for its energy, vigor, and impeccable style".

Mainstream success 
Creed's mainstream breakthrough success came in the mid-1980s with the fresh fougère fragrance Green Irish Tweed (1985). The first trademark for Creed perfume was registered in 1979 in France.

Creed's marketing masterpiece, the fragrance Aventus (2010) has seen good commercial success. Erwin Creed stated that the popularity of Aventus enabled Creed to open its New York boutique location.

Authorship 

Gabe Oppenheim's book, The Ghost Perfumer, interviews numerous perfumers and disputes Creed's claim that all of the fragrances are made in-house by members of the Creed family.  Pierre Bourdon claims to be the perfumer behind Green Irish Tweed (an early iteration of Davidoff's Cool Water, also made by Bourdon), Original Santal, Silver Mountain Water, Erolfa, Millesime Imperial among others.

List of publicly released fragrances 
Creed claims to make fragrances exclusively for their clients that are not available to their customers and that some of those fragrances are later released to the public. This is a list of the Creed fragrances that are (or were) sold to the general public.

Many of the fragrances on this list are not currently sold by Creed or authorized retailers because they were discontinued. Creed often discontinues ("vaults") fragrances. For example, Green Valley used to be a mainstream release but is no longer sold by Creed. Creed also claims to re-release fragrances that were created by the family many years ago in previous generations. Examples of this would include Selection Verte and (Vintage) Tabarome.

 2000 Fleurs
 Acier Aluminium
 Acqua Fiorentina
 Amalfi Flowers
 Ambre Cannelle
 Angélique Encens
 Aubepine Acacia
 Aventus
 Aventus Cologne
 Aventus for Her
 Baie de Genievre
 Bayrhum Vetiver
 Bois de Cedrat
 Bois de Santal
 Bois du Portugal
 Chevrefeuille
 Citrus Bigarrade
 Cuir de Russie
 Cypres Musc
 Epicea
 Erolfa
 Fantasia de Fleurs
 Feuilles Vertes
 Fleurs de Gardenia
 Fleur de Thé Rose Bulgare
 Fleurissimo
 Fleurs de Bulgarie
 Green Irish Tweed
 Green Valley
 Herbe Marine
 Himalaya
 Imperatrice Eugenie
 Irisia
 Jardin d'Amalfi
 Jasmal
 Jasmin Imperatrice Eugenie
 Les Floralies
 Love in Black
 Love in White
 Millesime 1849
 Millésime Impérial
 Neroli Sauvage
 Olivier Creed Eau de Cologne/Toilette (not fully confirmed)
 Orange Spice
 Original Santal
 Original Vetiver
 Private Collection Tabarome
 Pure White Cologne
 Rosalie
 Royal Ceylan
 Royal Delight
 Royal English Leather
 Royal Mayfair
 Royal Oud
 Royal Princess Oud
 Royal Service
 Royal Scottish Lavender
 Royal Water
 Santal Imperial
 Scent of Oger
 Selection Verte
 Silver Mountain Water
 Spice and Wood
 Spring Flower
 Sublime Vanille
 Tabarome
 Tabarome Millésime
 Tubereuse Indiana
 Vanisia
 Verveine Narcisse
 Vetiver
 Viking
 Viking Cologne
 Virgin Island Water
 White Flowers
 Windsor
 Ylang Jonquille
 Zeste Mandarine
 Zeste Mandarine Pamplemousse

See also 
 Charles Creed, fashion designer

References

External links 

 
 
MAXAROMA.COM

French brands
Perfume houses
History of cosmetics